Adolph Otto was a printer of Gustrow, Mecklenburg-Schwerin who printed the first stamps of Transvaal of 1870.

Later, Otto printed additional stamps from the original plates for sale to dealers for his own profit. He also applied fake cancels to the stamps and prepared new plates without permission to print additional stamps for his own benefit. The practices only stopped after he was visited by an official of the Transvaal government in 1882 and plates and stamps were seized. The forged stamps were sold through the Hamburg dealer Julius Goldner.

See also
Postage stamps and postal history of Transvaal

References

Further reading
Curle, J.H. & A.E. Basden. (1940) Transvaal Postage Stamps. London: Royal Philatelic Society.

External links
Transvaal: 1870 imperforate 1/- deep green, an unused tête-bêche pair. British Library Philatelic Collections

Year of birth unknown
Year of death unknown
Philately of South Africa
German printers
Stamp forgers